The 1985 UMass Minutemen football team represented the University of Massachusetts Amherst in the 1985 NCAA Division I-AA football season as a member of the Yankee Conference. The team was coached by Bob Stull and played its home games at Warren McGuirk Alumni Stadium in Hadley, Massachusetts. The 1985 season was notable as it was Bob Stull's last as coach of the Minutemen, as Stull left after the season to become the head coach at UTEP. UMass finished the season with a record of 7–4 overall and 4–1 in conference play.

Schedule

References

UMass
UMass Minutemen football seasons
UMass Minutemen football